The monarchs of Sicily ruled from the establishment of the County of Sicily in 1071 until the "perfect fusion" in the Kingdom of the Two Sicilies in 1816.

The origins of the Sicilian monarchy lie in the Norman conquest of southern Italy which occurred between the 11th and 12th century. Sicily, which was ruled as an Islamic emirate for at least two centuries, was invaded in 1071 by Norman House of Hauteville, who conquered Palermo and established a feudal county. The House of Hauteville completed their conquest of Sicily in 1091.

In 1130, the County of Sicily and the County of Apulia, ruled by different branches of the House of Hauteville, merged as the Kingdom of Sicily, and Count Roger II was crowned king by Antipope Anacletus II. In 1282, after the Sicilian Vespers, the kingdom split into separate states: the properly named "Ultra Sicily" (Siciliae ultra Pharum, Latin for "Sicily over the Strait") and "Hither Sicily" (Siciliae citra, commonly called "the Kingdom of Naples"). The two states always styled themselves "the Kingdom of Sicily", until the partial unification in 1516 when Charles I of Spain inherited both lands as "King of Naples and Sicily". Definitive unification occurred in 1816, when Ferdinand IV and III made the two entities into a single state, the Kingdom of the Two Sicilies.

Kingdom of Syracuse

Deinomenids (485–465)
Gelon I (485 BCE–478 BCE)
Hiero I (478 BCE–466 BCE)
Thrasybulus (466 BCE–465 BCE)

Dionysii (405–344)
Dionysius the Elder (405 BCE–367 BCE)
Dionysius the Younger (367 BCE–356 BCE)
Dion (357 BCE–355 BCE)
Calippus (355 BCE–353 BCE)
 (353 BCE–c.350 BCE)
 (c.350 BCE–346 BCE)
Dionysius the Younger (restored, 346 BCE–344 BCE)

Timoleon (345–337)
Timoleon (345 BCE–337 BCE)

Agathocles (317–289)
Agathocles (317 BCE–289 BCE)

Interregnum (289–276)
Hicetas (289 BCE–280 BCE)

Hieronids (275–214)
Hiero II (275 BCE–215 BCE)
Gelo II (until 216 BCE)
Hieronymus (215 BCE–214 BCE)

Emirs of Sicily

Kalbids

 al-Hasan al-Kalbi (948–953)
 Ahmad ibn al-Hasan al-Kalbi (954–969) 
 Ya'ish (969–970), usurper
 Abu'l-Qasim Ali ibn al-Hasan al-Kalbi (970–982) 
 Jabir al-Kalbi (982–983)
 Ja'far al-Kalbi (983–985)
 Abdallah al-Kalbi (985–990)
 Yusuf al-Kalbi (990–998)
 Ja'far al-Kalbi (998–1019)
 al-Akhal (1019–1037)
 Abdallah (1037–1040), Zirid usurper
 Hasan as-Samsam (1040–1053)

Taifa period

 Abdallah ibn Mankut - Trapani and Mazara (1053–?)
 Ibn al-Maklatí - Catania (1053–?)
 Muhammed ibn Ibrahim (Ibn Thumna) - Syracuse (1053–1062) and in later years Catania and Trapani/Mazara
 Alí ibn Nima (Ibn al-Hawwàs) - Agrigento and Castrogiovanni (1053–about 1065), all Taifas from 1062 
 Ayyub ibn Tamim (Zirid) (about 1065–1068)
 Ibn al-Ba'ba, Palermo (1068–1072)
 Hammad - Agrigento and Castrogiovanni (1068–1087)
 Ibn Abbad (Benavert) - Syracuse and Catania (1071–1086)

Counts of Sicily
Sicily was granted, pending its Christian reconquest, to Robert Guiscard as "duke" in 1059 by Pope Nicholas II. Then Guiscard granted it as a county to his brother Roger.

House of Hauteville, 1071-1130

|-
| Roger I 1071–1101 || ||1031son of Tancred of Hauteville and Fredisenda|| Judith of Évreux10614 childrenEremburga of Mortain10778 childrenAdelaide del Vasto10874 children|| 1101Miletoaged 70
|-
| Simon1101–1105 || ||1093son of Roger I of Sicily and Adelaide del Vasto || never married || 1105Miletoaged 12
|-
| Roger II1105–1130 ||  || 22 December 1095Miletoson of Roger I of Sicily and Adelaide del Vasto || Elvira of Castile11176 childrenSibyl of Burgundy11492 childrenBeatrix of Rethel11511 child || 26 February 1154Palermoaged 58
|}

Kings of Sicily
Roger II received royal investiture from Antipope Anacletus II in 1130 and recognition from Pope Innocent II in 1139. The Kingdom of Sicily, which by then comprised not only the island, but also the southern third of the Italian peninsula, rapidly expanded itself to include Malta and the Mahdia, the latter if only briefly.

House of Hauteville, 1130–1198

| Roger II1130–1154 ||  || 22 December 1095Miletoson of Roger I of Sicily and Adelaide del Vasto || Elvira of Castile11176 childrenSibyl of Burgundy11492 childrenBeatrix of Rethel11511 child || 26 February 1154Palermoaged 58||Papal bull byAntipope Anacletus II
|-
| William I the Bad1154–1166  ||  || 1121son of Roger II and Elvira of Castile|| Margaret of Navarre4 children|| 7 May 1166Palermoaged 45||Son of Roger IIAgnatic primogeniture
|-
| William II the Good1166–1189  ||  || 1155son of William I and Margaret of Navarre|| Joan of EnglandFebruary 11771 child|| 11 November 1189Palermoaged 34||Son of William IAgnatic primogeniture
|-
| Tancred I1189–1194(joint rule)||  || 1138illegitimate son of Roger III, Duke of Apulia|| Sibylla of Acerra6 children|| 20 February 1194Palermoaged 56|||Illegitimate grandson ofRoger IISeizure
|-
| Roger III1193(joint rule)||  ||1175son of Tancred of Sicily and Sibylla of Acerra || Irene Angelinano children || 24 December 1193aged 18||Son of Tancred IAgnatic primogeniture
|-
| William III1194 ||  || 1190son of Tancred and Sibylla of Acerra|| never married||1198aged 8||Son of Tancred IAgnatic primogeniture
|-
| Constance I1194–1198||  || 2 November 1154 daughter of Roger II and Beatrix of Rethel|| Henry VI, Holy Roman Emperor11841 child|| 27 November 1198Palermoaged 44||Posthumous daughter ofRoger IIRight of Conquest
|-
|}
Constance was married to the Emperor Henry VI and he pressed his claim to the kingdom from William II's death, but only succeeded in displacing his wife's family in 1194.

There is evidence that, during the baronial revolt of 1197, there was an attempt to make Count Jordan Lupin of Bovino king in opposition to Henry VI. He may even have been crowned and seems to have had the support of Constance, who had turned against her husband. In the end he was captured and executed. He is accepted as a pretender to the throne by modern historians Evelyn Jamison and Thomas Curtis Van Cleve.

House of Hohenstaufen, 1194–1266

| Henry VI1194–1197 ||  || November 1165Nijmegenson of Frederick I, Holy Roman Emperor and Beatrix of Burgundy ||Constance of Sicily11841 child||  28 September 1197Messinaaged 32||Husband of ConstanceJure uxoris
|-
| Frederick II1198–1250(joint rule)||  ||26 December 1194Jesison of Henry I and Constance I||Constance of Aragon15 August 12091 childYolande of Jerusalem9 November 12252 childrenIsabella of England15 July 12354 children|| 13 December 1250Torremaggioreaged 55||Son of ConstanceJure matris
|-
| Henry II1212–1217(joint rule)||  || 1211Sicilyson of Frederick II and Constance of Aragon ||Margaret of Austria29 November 12252 children|| 12 February 1242Martiranoaged 30||Son of Frederick IAgnatic primogeniture
|-
| Conrad I1250–1254 ||  ||25 April 1228Andriason of Frederick II and Yolande of Jerusalem ||Elisabeth of Bavaria1 September 12461 child|| 21 May 1254Lavelloaged 26||Son of Frederick IAgnatic primogeniture
|-
| Conrad II the Younger1254–1258||  ||25 March 1252Wolfsteinson of Conrad I and Elisabeth of Bavaria ||never married||29 October 1268Naplesaged 16(executed)||Son of Conrad IAgnatic primogeniture
|-
| Manfred1258–1266||  ||1232Illegitimate son of Frederick II ||Beatrice of Savoy21 April 12471 childHelena Angelina Doukaina9 November 12555 children||26 February 1266Battle of Beneventoaged 34(killed in action)||Illegitimate son of Frederick ISeizure
|-
|}
Manfred was regent of Sicily for his nephew, the child Conrad II ("Conradin"), but took the crown in 1258, and continued to fight to keep the kingdom under the Hohenstaufen. In 1254 the pope, having declared the kingdom a papal possession, offered the crown to the King of England's son, Edmund Crouchback, but the English never succeeded in taking the kingdom. In 1262 the pope reversed his previous decision and granted the kingdom to the King of France's brother, Charles of Anjou, who succeeded in dispossessing Manfred in 1266. Conradin continued his claim to the throne until his death by decapitation perpetrated by Charles of Anjou in 1268.

Plantagenet Dynasty
Edmund Crouchback, son of King Henry III of England, claimed the Crown of Sicily between 1254 and 1263.  Both he and his father took the claim very seriously, but it was completely ineffectual.

Capetian House of Anjou, 1266–1282

| Charles I1266–1282 ||  || 21 March 1227son of Louis VIII of France and Blanche of Castile || Beatrice of Provence31 January 12466 childrenMargaret of Nevers18 November 1268childless || 7 January 1285Foggiaaged 57
|-
|}
Peter III of Aragon, Manfred's son in law, of the House of Barcelona, conquered the island of Sicily from Charles I in 1282 and had himself crowned King of Sicily. Thereafter the old Kingdom of Sicily was centred on the mainland, with capital at Naples, and although informally called Kingdom of Naples it was still known formally as "Kingdom of Sicily". Thus, there were two "Sicilies" — the island kingdom, however, was often called "Sicily beyond the Lighthouse" or "Trinacria", by terms of a treaty between the two states.

House of Barcelona, 1282–1410

| Constance II (joint rule)1268/1282–1285 ||  || 1249 Sicily daughter of Manfred of Sicily and Beatrice of Savoy || Peter I the Great13 June 1262 6 children || 9 April 1302Barcelona, Spain aged 52 or 53||Daughter of Manfred of SicilyRight of conquest
|-
| Peter I the Great (joint rule)1282–1285 ||  || 1240Valenciason of James I of Aragon and Yolanda of Hungary || Constance of Sicily13 June 12626 children || 2 November 1285Vilafranca del Penedèsaged 45||Husband of Constance IIJure uxoris
|-
| James the Just1285–1295||  ||10 August 1267Valenciason of Peter I and Constance of Sicily|| Isabella of Castile1 December 1291 No childrenBlanche of Anjou29 October 129510 childrenMarie de Lusignan15 June 1315 No childrenElisenda de Montcada25 December 1322 No children || 5 November 1327Barcelonaaged 60||Son of Peter I and Constance IISalic patrimony
|-
| Frederick II1295–1337 ||  || 13 December 1272Barcelonason of Peter I and Constance of Sicily|| Eleanor of Anjou17 May 13029 children || 25 June 1337Palermoaged 65||Regent brother of JamesElection
|-
| Peter II1337–1342 ||  ||July 1305son of Frederick II and Eleanor of Anjou|| Elisabeth of Carinthia23 April 13229 children ||15 August 1342Calascibettaaged 37||Son of Frederick IIAgnatic primogeniture
|-
| Louis1342–1355 ||  ||1337Cataniason of Peter II and Elisabeth of Carinthia|| Never married||16 October 1355Aci Castelloaged 18||Son of Peter IIAgnatic primogeniture
|-
| Frederick III the Simple1355–1377 ||  ||1 September 1341Cataniason of Peter II and Elisabeth of Carinthia|| Constance of Aragon11 April 13611 childAntonia of Balzo17 January 1372No children || 27 January 1377Messinaaged 36||Son of Peter IIBrother of LouisAgnatic primogeniture
|-
| Maria1377–1401(joint rule)||  ||1363Cataniadaughter of Frederick III and Constance of Aragon|| Martin I of Sicily13901 child || 25 May 1401Lentiniaged 38||Daughter of Frederick IIICognatic primogeniture
|-
| Martin I the Younger1390–1409(joint rule)||  ||1374son of Martin I of Aragon and Maria of Luna|| Maria of Sicily13901 child || 25 July 1409Cagliariaged 35||Husband of MariaJure uxoris
|-
| Martin II the Elder1409–1410 ||  || 1356Gironason of Peter IV of Aragon and Eleanor of Sicily||Maria de Luna13 June 13724 childrenMargarita of Aragon-Prades1409No children||31 May 1410Barcelonaaged 54||Maternal grandson of Peter IICognatic primogeniture
|-
|}
Martin I died without an heir in 1409 and the kingdom was inherited by his father who united it to the Crown of Aragon.

House of Trastámara, 1412–1516

| Ferdinand I the Honest1412–1416 ||  || 27 November 1380Medina del Camposon of John I of Castile and Eleanor of Aragon||Eleanor of Alburquerque13948 children|| 2 April 1416Igualadaaged 36
|-
| Alfonso the Magnanimous1416–1458 ||  || 1396Medina del Camposon of Ferdinand I and Eleanor of Alburquerque||Maria of Castile1415No children|| 27 June 1458Naplesaged 52
|-
| John the Great1458–1468||  || 29 June 1397Medina del Camposon of Ferdinand I and Eleanor of Alburquerque|| Blanche I of Navarre6 November 14194 childrenJuana Enríquez2 children ||20 January 1479Barcelonaaged 81
|-
| Ferdinand II the Catholic1468–1516||  || 10 March 1452son of John II of Aragon and Juana Enriquez|| Isabella I of Castile19 October 14695 childrenGermaine of Foix1505No children ||23 January 1516Madrigalejoaged 63
|-
| Joanna the Mad1516–1555||  || 6 November 1479daughter of Ferdinand II of Aragon and Isabella I of Castile|| Philip IV of Burgundy14966 children|| 12 April 1555Madrigalejoaged 75
|-
|}

Joanna was confined under alleged insanity during her whole reign.

House of Habsburg, 1516-1700

|-
| Charles II1516–1554 ||  || 24 February 1500Ghentson of Philip I of Castile and Joanna of Castile||Isabella of Portugal10 March 15263 children ||21 September 1558Yusteaged 58
|-
| Philip I1554–1598 ||  || 21 May 1527Valladolidson of Charles II and Isabella of Portugal||Maria of Portugal15431 childMary I of England1554No childrenElisabeth of Valois15592 childrenAnna of Austria4 May 15705 children||13 September 1598Madridaged 71
|-
| Philip II1598–1621||  || 14 April 1578Madridson of Philip I and Anna of Austria||Margaret of Austria18 April 15995 children||31 March 1621Madridaged 42
|-
| Philip III1621–1665||  || 8 April 1605Valladolidson of Philip II and Margaret of Austria||Elisabeth of Bourbon16157 childrenMariana of Austria16495 children||17 September 1665Madridaged 60
|-
| Charles III1665–1700||  || 6 November 1661Madridson of Philip III and Mariana of Austria||Maria Luisa of Orléans19 November 1679No childrenMaria Anna of Neuburg14 May 1690No children||1 November 1700Madridaged 38
|-
|}

House of Bourbon, 1700-1713, during War of the Spanish Succession

|-
| Philip IV1700–1713||  || 19 December 1683Versaillesson of Louis, Dauphin of France and Maria Anna of Bavaria||Maria Luisa of Savoy2 November 17014 childrenElisabeth of Parma24 December 17147 children||9 July 1746Madridaged 62
|-
|}
At the end of the War of the Spanish Succession, by the Treaty of Utrecht, Sicily was ceded to the Duke of Savoy.

House of Savoy, 1713–1720

| Victor Amadeus1713–1720 ||  || 14 May 1666Turinson of Charles Emmanuel II, Duke of Savoy and Marie Jeanne Baptiste de Savoie-Nemours||Anne Marie of Orléans10 April 16846 children||31 October 1732Moncalieriaged 66
|-
|}
The Spanish invaded the kingdom in 1718 during the War of the Quadruple Alliance. The Duke of Savoy ceded it to Austria in 1720 by the Treaty of The Hague.

House of Habsburg, 1720–1735

| Charles IV1720–1735 ||  || 1 October 1685Viennason of Leopold I, Holy Roman Emperor and Eleonore-Magdalena of Pfalz-Neuburg||Elisabeth Christine1 August 17084 children|| 20 October 1740Viennaaged 55
|-
|}
Charles I, Duke of Parma conquered the kingdom during the War of the Polish Succession. At the end of the war Sicily was ceded to the new Charles V of Sicily.

House of Bourbon 1735–1816

| Charles V1735–1759 ||  || 20 January 1716Madridson of Philip IV and Elizabeth of Parma||Maria Amalia of Saxony173813 children||14 December 1788Madridaged 72
|-
| Ferdinand III1759–1816||  || 12 January 1751Naplesson of Charles V and Maria Amalia of Saxony||Marie Caroline of Austria12 May 176817 childrenLucia Migliaccio of Floridia27 November 1814No children||4 January 1825Naplesaged 73
|-
|}
In 1816 the Kingdom of Naples and the Kingdom of Sicily were merged as the new Kingdom of the Two Sicilies.

House of Bourbon-Two Sicilies 1816–1861

Family tree

See also
List of Sicilian consorts
List of viceroys of Sicily
List of Counts of Apulia and Calabria
List of monarchs of Naples
List of monarchs of the Two Sicilies

References

Sicily